The Carnegie Library in Corbin, Kentucky, United States, is a building from 1916. It was listed on the National Register of Historic Places in 1986.

It is a five-bay two-story building with a stepped brick parapet.

It has also served as the WYGO radio station.

References

Corbin, Kentucky
Library buildings completed in 1916
Libraries on the National Register of Historic Places in Kentucky
Neoclassical architecture in Kentucky
National Register of Historic Places in Whitley County, Kentucky
Carnegie libraries in Kentucky
1916 establishments in Kentucky